"Fingers Crossed" is a song by British-born Canadian singer-songwriter Lauren Spencer-Smith, self-released as a single on January 5, 2022. It was written by Spencer-Smith, Fransisca Hall and Jakke Erixson, and produced by Erixson. The song went viral on TikTok and charted in various countries, reaching number one in Ireland and Norway.

Background
Lauren Spencer-Smith is a British-born Canadian singer-songwriter from Vancouver Island who competed on season 18 of American Idol in 2020, where she made it to the top 20 but was eliminated during the first week of remote shows. In November 2021, she posted a 47-second clip of herself to TikTok relaxing in the studio while listening to the demo of the song, which received more than 23 million views. Its success as well as comments from viewers helped convince her to release a studio version of the song.

Composition
Spencer-Smith's vocal range spans from F 3 to C 5.

Critical reception
Steve Holden of Newsbeat called it a "classic heartbreak anthem with lyrics about 'taking back the tears I've cried' and trying to fix an ex's 'daddy issues'". George Griffiths of the Official Charts Company described the track as a "gut-wrenching breakup track with hyper-specific lyrics", writing that it is "taken straight from the Taylor Swift songbook" and "diaristic in form".

Charts

Weekly charts

Year-end charts

Certifications

Release history

References

2022 singles
2022 songs
Lauren Spencer-Smith songs
Irish Singles Chart number-one singles
Number-one singles in Norway
Songs about heartache
Songs written by Fransisca Hall
Songs written by Jakke Erixson
Songs written by Lauren Spencer-Smith